The 19th Hollywood Film Awards were held on November 1st, 2015. The ceremony took place at The Beverly Hilton Hotel in Santa Monica, California.

Winners
 Hollywood Career Achievement Award: Robert De Niro
 Hollywood Producer Award: Ridley Scott – The Martian
 Hollywood Director Award: Tom Hooper – The Danish Girl
 Hollywood Actor Award: Will Smith – Concussion
 Hollywood Actress Award: Carey Mulligan – Suffragette
 Hollywood Supporting Actor Award: Benicio del Toro – Sicario
 Hollywood Supporting Actress Award: Jane Fonda – Youth
 Hollywood Breakout Actor Award: Joel Edgerton – Black Mass
 Hollywood Breakout Actress Award: Alicia Vikander – The Danish Girl
 New Hollywood Award: Saoirse Ronan – Brooklyn
 Hollywood Ensemble Award: Cast of The Hateful Eight
 Hollywood Breakout Ensemble Award: Corey Hawkins, O'Shea Jackson Jr. & Jason Mitchell Straight Outta Compton
 Hollywood Comedy Award: Amy Schumer - Trainwreck
 Hollywood Breakthrough Director Award: Adam McKay - The Big Short
 Hollywood Screenwriter Award: Tom McCarthy and Josh Singer – Spotlight
 Hollywood Blockbuster Award: Furious 7
 Hollywood Song Award: Wiz Khalifa and Charlie Puth – "See You Again" from Furious 7
 Hollywood Documentary Award: Asif Kapadia – Amy
 Hollywood Animation Award: Pete Docter – Inside Out
 Hollywood Cinematography Award: Janusz Kaminski – Bridge of Spies
 Hollywood Film Composer Award: Alexandre Desplat - The Danish Girl and Suffragette
 Hollywood Editor Award: David Rosenbloom - Black Mass
 Hollywood Visual Effects Award: Tim Alexander – Jurassic World
 Hollywood Sound Award: Gary Rydstrom – Bridge of Spies
 Hollywood Costume Design Award: Sandy Powell – Cinderella
 Hollywood Production Design Award: Colin Gibson – Mad Max: Fury Road
 Hollywood Make-Up & Hair Styling Award: Lesley Vanderwalt – Mad Max: Fury Road

References

External links
 

Hollywood
2015 in California
Hollywood Film Awards
2015 in American cinema